David Pate was the defending champion, but lost in the quarterfinals to John McEnroe.

Mikael Pernfors won the title by defeating Andre Agassi 6–2, 7–5 in the final.

Seeds

Draw

Finals

Top half

Bottom half

References

External links
 Official results archive (ATP)
 Official results archive (ITF)

Los Angeles Open (tennis)
1988 Grand Prix (tennis)
Volvo Tennis Los Angeles
Volvo Tennis Los Angeles